Robert Anthony Maranto (born March 28, 1958) is a political scientist who holds the 21st Century Chair in Leadership at the Department of Education Reform at the University of Arkansas.

Maranto earned his doctorate in political science from the University of Minnesota in 1989, and has taught at ten colleges and universities. The son of a career bureaucrat, he is strongly interested in efforts to make public bureaucracies better serve the public. He has written widely on civil service reform, university reform, and school reform, particularly on charter schools.

Prior to his appointment at UA, Maranto taught at Villanova University and served in the Clinton administration and at the Brookings Institution. With others including his wife April, he has produced eleven scholarly books, including President Obama and Education Reform, A Guide to Charter Schools, Beyond a Government of Strangers, and Radical Reform of the Civil Service. In 2009 he co-edited both the conservative-leaning The Politically Correct University, and the liberal-leaning Judging Bush. His co-authored Education Reform in the Obama Era: The Second Term and the 2016 Election, will be published December 2015 by Palgrave. , he is working on a book for Rowman and Littlefield, tentatively titled For School Choice: Lessons from two decades of Arizona charter schools. Maranto edits the Journal of School Choice. His more than 70 scholarly publications have appeared in journals including Social Science Quarterly, the Journal of Educational Research, the Journal of School Leadership, Education Next, Computers and Education, and Public Administration Review. His newspaper op-eds have appeared in numerous venues including The Wall Street Journal, Philadelphia Inquirer, Baltimore Sun, Arkansas Democrat Gazette, and Houston Chronicle. He currently serves on the board of a nonprofit cyber charter school serving at-risk youth, Achievement House. He also serves on the Arkansas Advisory Committee for the U.S. Civil Rights Commission. His children, Tony and Maya, attend public schools in Fayetteville.

Education
 B.S., University of Maryland, 1980
 Ph.D. University of Minnesota, 1989

Recent books
 Maranto, R., R. Redding, and F. Hess eds. (2009) The Politically Correct University, Washington: AEI Press.
 Maranto, R., T. Lansford, and J. Johnson eds. (2009) Judging Bush, Stanford: Stanford University Press.
 Kayes, Myron and Robert Maranto eds. (2006) A Guide to Charter Schools: Research and Practical Advice for Educators, Littlefield Education.
 Maranto, Robert, Douglas M. Brattebo, and Tom Lansford, eds. (2006) The Second Term of George W. Bush: Prospects and Perils, New York: Macmillan/Palgrave.
 Maranto, R. (2005) Beyond a Government of Strangers: How Career Executives and Political Appointees Can Turn Conflict to Cooperation, Lanham: Lexington.
 Condrey, S. and R. Maranto, eds. (2001) Radical Reform of the Civil Service, Lanham: Lexington.
 Maranto, R., S. R. Milliman, F. Hess, and A.W. Gresham, eds. (1999) School Choice in the Real World: Lessons from Arizona Charter Schools, Boulder: Westview.

Recent reports
 Maranto, R., Gary Ritter, and Sandra Stotsky (2008) “The Good, the Bad, and the Ugly: Will President Obama’s School Reform Bring the Change Kids Need?” Golden, CO: Independence Institute (IP-10-2008).
 Maranto, R., Nathan A. Benefield, and Jason O’Brien (2007) “Edifice Complex: Where has all the Money Gone?,” The Commonwealth Foundation for Public Policy Alternatives.

Opinion articles
 Maranto, R. and McShane, M. (11 April 2011) “What Michelle Rhee got right,” The Baltimore Sun
 Maranto, R. (10 April 2011) “Only two cheers for standardized testing,” The Arkansas Democrat-Gazette
 Maranto, R. (16 March 2011) “Six things we know about charter schools,”  Portland Press Herald
 Maranto, R. (24 February 2011) “On teachers unions, the devil is in the details,” Milwaukee Journal Sentinel
 Maranto, R. (20 February 2011) “An entrepreneurial model of education,” Houston Chronicle B10
 Maranto, R. (9 February 2011) “The Future of Education: President Obama should keep President Ike Eisenhower in mind,” The Philadelphia Inquirer
 Maranto, R. and Wolf, P. J. (1 December 2010) “Good government is risky business,” The Philadelphia Inquirer
 Maranto, R. (1 December 2010) “A way out for troubled children,” Atlanta Journal Constitution
 Maranto, R. (9 August 2010) “Putting learning first: Standards outdated,” Arkansas Democrat Gazette
 Maranto, R. (2 August 2010) “Immigrants in a changed nation,” Baltimore Sun
 Maranto, R. (14 June 2010) “Public Schools Doing Their Jobs,” Northwest Arkansas Times
 Maranto, R. (10 May 2010) “Priests, teachers, and culture warriors,” Philadelphia Daily News
 Maranto, R. and Gary Compton (27 December 2009) “Three ideas to make Arkansas public schools the best,” Arkansas Democrat-Gazette
 Maranto, R. (28 October 2009) “Power to the principals,” The Baltimore Sun
 Maranto, R. (6 October 2009) “Censoring Horowitz shows SLU needs diversity of thought,” St. Louis Post-Dispatch
 Maranto, R. (23 September 2009) “Reactions to Obama: It’s us, not him,” Philadelphia Daily News
 Maranto, R. (17 April 2009) “What to do without the millage?” Northwest Arkansas Times, A4
 Maranto, R. (26 July 2009) “Do gay rights trump religion?” Hartford Courant, C1
 Maranto, R. and April Gresham Maranto (21 June 2009) “Lots of devils in this contract’s details,” Arkansas Democrat Gazette, p. 80
 Maranto, R. (19 April 2009) “A tale of two state school systems,” Arkansas Democrat Gazette
 Maranto, R. (2 March 2009) “Barack Hussein Reagan?” Philadelphia Daily News, p. 21
 Maranto, R. (16 February 2009) “History shows no one best way: ‘Global Achievement Gap’ would leave poor children behind,” Northwest Arkansas Times, A4
 S. Buck and R. Maranto (22 December 2008) “Obama gets an A,” Arkansas Democrat Gazette, 5B
 Maranto, R. (17 December 2008) “Cities Need Charter Schools,” Philadelphia Inquirer

References

External links

1958 births
Living people
University System of Maryland alumni
University of Minnesota College of Liberal Arts alumni
University of Arkansas faculty
American political scientists